Metamorphosis Alpha is a science fiction role-playing game. It was created by James M. Ward and originally produced by TSR, the publisher of Dungeons & Dragons. It was the first science fiction role-playing game, published in July 1976.

Description
The original edition is set on a generation spaceship, the starship Warden that has been struck by an unknown cataclysmic event that killed many of the colonists and crew. The characters must survive their missions in this ship (which they believe to be a world) where they no longer understand the technology around them, and they encounter numerous mutated creatures.

Players can portray a human, a mutated human, a mutated plant, or a mutated creature. Articles in Dragon expanded these options to include clones and robots as well as adding rules for cybernetics. Players have five characteristics: radiation resistance, mental resistance, dexterity, strength, and constitution. Humans have a sixth characteristic, leadership potential, while mutated humans and creatures add a random number of mutations, both physical and mental. Metamorphosis Alpha's combat rules resemble those in the original edition of Dungeons & Dragons (D&D).

Metamorphosis Alpha is the intellectual precursor to Gamma World (1978), also produced by TSR.

Science fiction or science fantasy?
Metamorphosis Alpha has an emphasis on super science and an element of science fantasy (as confirmed by creator James M. Ward in 2006). Ward has stated that the game is not "hard sci-fi".

In 1980, TSR released AD&D module S3: Expedition to the Barrier Peaks. The module was based on the idea that a starship such as the Warden (though not the Warden itself, according to TSR founder Gary Gygax) becomes marooned in a D&D universe. In the module's foreword, Gygax writes that the module was written to introduce Metamorphosis Alpha to the wider D&D audience and to demonstrate how one might undertake science fiction/fantasy crossover.

Inspiration
James M. Ward, the game's author, stated that the original inspiration for the game was Brian Aldiss's science fiction novel Non-Stop (also known as Starship, 1958). In the British RPG magazine White Dwarf, issue 1, Ian Livingstone wrote a review of the game and published his own additional rules for playing Metamorphosis Alpha on Aldiss's ship. However, it is often suggested that the game was inspired by Robert A. Heinlein's 1941 novel Orphans of the Sky. James M. Ward has stated that he was not familiar with the 1973 Canadian TV series The Starlost, a show with a similar concept, and that Metamorphosis Alpha is not based upon that series.

Ownership and rights
The rights to Metamorphosis Alpha are owned by James M. Ward. Ward also owns the rights to all Metamorphosis Alpha material previously published in Dragon. WardCo. (Ward's publishing business) has been granted permission by Steve Jackson Games and by Judges Guild (the estate of Bob Bledsaw Sr.) to host and republish some material. In 2008, Ward requested via public forums that sites hosting unlicensed copies of his original rules and the material previously published in Dragon magazine remove them, as they were a breach of his copyright and directly competed with products that he is selling. All permissions to host the Metamorphosis Alpha rules and the Metamorphosis Alpha articles in Dragon magazine, other than those being sold on behalf of WardCo., at sites other than at the official homepage have been rescinded.
In 2010, Signal Fire Studios acquired the rights to produce a new edition of the game based upon Hasbro's 4th edition D&D.
In 2011, Ward announced that he had negotiated a deal to produce a graphic novel of Metamorphosis Alpha.

Editions and supplements

Metamorphosis Alpha was first published in 1976 by TSR. It was written by James M. Ward and illustrated by Dave Sutherland III.

In 1981, Ward announced plans to rewrite the game as Metamorphosis Alpha to Omega, a supplement for the 1st edition Gamma World rules (Anon 1981).  The Gamma World supplement was never completed, but in 1994, TSR used the title Metamorphosis Alpha to Omega for an Amazing Engine supplement written by Slade Henson.

In 2002, Ward's company, Fast Forward Entertainment, published a new version of the game, entitled Metamorphosis Alpha: 25th Anniversary Edition.  It was designed by Ward himself.

In 2006, Metamorphosis Alpha 4th Edition was released by Mudpuppy Games.  This edition contained original material by Ward and additional new material and photography by Craig J. Brain. The book cover and interior illustrations were painted and drawn by Jim Holloway with most of the cartography by Ryan Wolfe.

In 2007, WardCo. released an official errata sheet for Metamorphosis Alpha First Edition, which is available from the official website and released a revised edition of the first-edition rules through OneBookShelf as a PDF.

In 2010, WardCo. released The House On The Hill adventure module for Metamorphosis Alpha (1st edition) as a PDF through OneBookshelf and the printed edition through Amazon. The adventure was written by Craig J. Brain, with bonus content by James M. Ward. The illustrations for the adventure were by Lee Smith and Dave Sutherland III.

In 2012, WardCo. released a reprint of the original edition of the game via Lulu with the addition of a new adventure and a number of corrections.

In 2014, WardCo and Goodman Games. released a hardbound deluxe edition of the original 1st edition via kickstarter including new adventures and consolidated other content from magazines and new content.

Reception
Robert R. Taylor reviewed Metamorphosis Alpha in The Space Gamer No. 10. Taylor concluded that "The game is definitely first rate and quite excellent. MA is highly recommended to someone interested in buying their first role-playing game since the rules are rich with guidelines to help the player in constructing his own ship."

In the inaugural issue of Ares, game designer Eric Goldberg thought the game too limited in scope, saying, "Metamorphosis: Alpha is Dungeons and Dragons in space. Regrettably, one can only stretch a great idea so far; this offering is far too contrived to gain acceptance in the minds of most players." Goldberg concluded by giving the game a very poor rating of only 3 out of 9. 

In the 1980 book The Complete Book of Wargames, game designer Jon Freeman commented, "James Ward's Metamorphosis Alpha is an attempt ... by the people who brought you Dungeons & Dragons, and predictably, it shares many of the parent game's flaws. The rules are better constructed but the game takes itself too seriously." Freeman gave this game an Overall Evaluation of "Fair", concluding , "The game is Dungeons & Dragons in disguise; it could as easily been called Missiles & Mutants. As an honest fantasy, it would be no worse than most. As 'science fiction', it comes out looking like Gorgo Meets Star Wars."

David M. Ewalt, in his book Of Dice and Men, commented that Metamorphosis Alpha was "notable as the first role-playing game with a science-fiction setting. The game takes place on the starship Warden, a vast spaceship built by the player characters' ancestors; in the aftermath of some unknown disaster, their progeny survive on the ship but don't understand its technology and must fight mutated creatures to ensure their survival."

Metamorphosis Alpha was chosen for inclusion in the 2007 book Hobby Games: The 100 Best. Game designer Gary Gygax explained: "Metamorphosis Alpha is a game that breaks the typical level-progression reward mold but nevertheless offers a rich, if sometimes difficult to gain, array of player rewards — from the knowledge of the environment to beneficial character mutations, learned skills to the acquisition of tech items and other equipment. Furthermore it blends fantasy with weird and super science in a unique manner that is captivating to players with imaginations suited to such a startling mixture. Metamorphosis Alpha — in any edition — stimulates the imagination, encourages keen thinking, and breaks the mold of typical fantasy and science fiction roleplaying games. If that doesn't make it one of the best hobby games ever, I don't know what would."

See also
Gamma World
Non-Stop, a novel by Brian Aldiss with a similar plot
Orphans of the Sky, a novel by Robert A. Heinlein with a similar plot
The Starlost, a Canada/US TV series from 1973 has a similar premise
Hull Zero Three, a 2010 novel by Greg Bear with a similar plot
Pandorum, a 2009 film which shares similar plot elements

Notes

References
Anon 1981. 'RPGA Interview with... Jim Ward.' RPGA News, 3:6-12 (Winter 1981-82).

External links
Paul Madison's Metamorphosis Alpha homepage.
Hard bound collectors edition kickstarter

Role-playing games introduced in 1976
Science fiction role-playing games
TSR, Inc. games
Science fantasy role-playing games